Denis Henry may refer to:

Sir Denis Henry (1864–1925), Irish lawyer and politician
Sir Denis Henry (English judge) (1931–2010), English Queen's Counsel and Lord Justice of Appeal
Denis Henry (cricketer) (1907–1990), English cricketer